Rahil Hesan (born August 31, 1978) is a fashion designer and fashion entrepreneur, born in Dubai. She began her career in 2005 in the field of couture.

Education 
In 2015, Hesan graduated from the Cavendish College London, majoring in fashion design, accessory designs, textile, color theory and fashion psychology.

Career 
In 2007, two years after graduating from college, Rahil founded her company Warda Haute Couture, based in Dubai. Her creations were worn by  Carrie Underwood.

In 2016, Hesan  participated at the Art Hearts Los Angeles Fashion Week Runway Show.

References

External links 
 

Living people
1985 births
Iranian fashion designers
Iranian women fashion designers
Emirati fashion designers
Emirati women fashion designers